WHAK-FM (99.9 FM, "The Wave") is a radio station licensed to Rogers City, Michigan with studios in Alpena. The station plays classic hits of the 1980s and 1990s. It has a local weekday-morning show and airs Local Radio Networks' "Classic Hits" format the remainder of the time.

Prior to April 1999, the station broadcast a satellite-fed country format as "Eagle 100" (with the call sign WELG from 1994 to 1997).  The move to the oldies format helped to fill a void in the Northeast Michigan radio scene left when 92.5 WAIR (now WFDX) switched from oldies to country music.

WHAK-FM is owned by Edwards Communications along with WHSB-FM 107.7 in Alpena, and WWTH-FM 100.7 in Oscoda. Former sister station WHAK-AM 960 airs talk programming in a simulcast with WJML 1110 AM in Petoskey; it is now owned by Mitten News, LLC.

The WHAK calls stand for the station's original owner, Harvey A. Klann.  Klann is a lifelong resident of Rogers City and World War 2 veteran.

Sources
Michiguide.com - WHAK-FM History

External links

HAK-FM
Classic hits radio stations in the United States
Radio stations established in 1984